The George Medal is awarded by the United Kingdom and Commonwealth of Nations for acts of great bravery; over 2,000 medals have been awarded since its inception in September 1940. Below is set out a selection of recipients of the award, since 1990. A person's presence in this list does not suggest their award was more notable than any other award of the George Medal.

Where a recipient has received a second GM, a picture of the ribbon bearing the bar symbol is shown. In December 1977 the provisions for the medal were altered, allowing it to be awarded posthumously, in which case the "" symbol appears next to the recipient's name.

1990s

2000s 

Paul Anthony Jobbins 
Colonel 
Royal Marines Reserve

Paul Jobbins deployed to the Democratic Republic of Congo as Chief of Staff United Nations Joint Operations Centre, Bukavu in Eastern DRC.  Serious fighting broke out between two rival factions of the Congolese Land Forces claiming over a hundred lives, with hundreds injured and displaced.
After negotiating a ceasefire, Jobbins arranged a meeting between the dissident former General Nkunda and the United Nations Force Commander having driven through sustained crossfire between retreating Government forces and the advancing rebels.
Recognised by all UN personnel in Bukavu, civil and military alike, as one of the few UN officers with commitment and courage, his gallant leadership under fire inspired renewed confidence of those around him.

2010s

See also 

 List of recipients of the George Medal for other decades

References

1990s